Anisoyl chloride (also called methoxybenzoyl chloride) is an acyl halide, specifically an aromatic acyl chloride, and may be formed from anisic acid by replacing a hydroxyl group of the carboxylic acid with a chloride group. There are three isomers: the ortho-, meta-, and para- forms. Their structures differ in the arene substitution pattern—the location of the methoxy group on the ring as compared to the acyl halide.

References
 National Institute of Standards and Technology (NIST) reference data for anisoyl chloride
 

Benzene derivatives
Acyl chlorides
Phenol ethers